Abrikosov (masculine) or Abrikosova (feminine) is a Russian surname. It derives from the Russian word "" (abrikos), meaning apricot.

The line of Abrikosovs began with the Penza peasant Semyon Nikolayev, who migrated to Moscow in 1802 and later opened a confectionery plant there. As he started his business with importing and selling fruit (including apricots), he petitioned, and in 1814 was allowed, to change his surname to Abrikosov.

People with this surname
Alexei Ivanovich Abrikosov (1875–1955), Russian/Soviet pathologist
Alexei Alexeyevich Abrikosov (1928–2017), Soviet/Russian theoretical physicist; son of Alexei Ivanovich Abrikosov
Andrei Abrikosov (1906–1973), Soviet stage and film actor
Anna Abrikosova (1882–1936), Russian Eastern Catholic and translator
Grigori Abrikosov (1932–1993), Soviet actor, son of Andrei Abrikosov
Tatiana Abrikosova, Russian basketball player for Dynamo Moscow
Vladimir Abrikosov (1880–1966), Russian Catholic priest

See also
Abrikosov vortex, a vortex of supercurrent under supeconductivity conditions

References

Notes

Sources
Ю. А. Федосюк (Yu. A. Fedosyuk). "Русские фамилии: популярный этимологический словарь" (Russian Last Names: a Popular Etymological Dictionary). Москва, 2006. 

Russian-language surnames
